Prof. Mohammed bin Ali Al-Hayaza'() is a  Saudi chemist and politician. Who has a long experience in the field of education and has championed academic excellence and research. He is the current president of Alfaisal University since (March 1, 2015). His initiatives bolstered opportunities for experiential learning, and secured funding for research and visionary ventures. These initiatives helped Alfaisal University gain a prominent position in the global rankings of universities from one of the Top 800 (2017) to one of the Top 300 (2020) universities in the world according to the Times Higher Education World University Rankings [Alfaisal University faced criticism for its claims of being the best University in the Arab world and in KSA.]. Prof. Alhayaza is also serving as the Chairman of Misk schools board, member of KAUST board of trustees, member of the first universities affairs council and member of the education & training evaluation commission board. Prior to joining Alfaisal, Al-Hayaza served as the vice president for post Graduate Studies and Research in King Khalid University from 2002-2007 and the president of Jazan University from 2007 to 2014. At the time of his appointment, Jazan University had only three colleges and 3,000 students but under his leadership, it expanded to 40 colleges with an enrollment of 70,000 students.  Later, he was appointed as health minister in 2014. In 2015, Al-Hayaza got appointed to the Shoura Council, where he served until 2016.

Career

 Member of the Education & Training Evaluation Commission board (January 2021– Present)
Member of the universities affair council (March 2020 – Present) 
 Chairman of Misk schools board (June 2019 – Present)
 Member of KAUST board of trustees (April 2018 – Present)
President of Alfaisal University (March 2015 – Present)    
 Member of The Saudi Shura Council (14 February 2015 – 2016)                                     
 Minister of Health, Kingdom of Saudi Arabia ( 2104-2015)                                
President of Jazan University (24 Nov. 2007 – 7 Dec. 2014)                      
Vice President for Post Graduate Studies and Research King Khalid University(10 Aug. 2002 – 23 Nov. 2007)     
Professor, Department of Chemistry King Khalid University (25 April 2003 – 23 Nov. 2007)      
Associate Professor, Department of Chemistry College of Science, King Khalid University (19 Oct.1998–24 April 2003)        
Dean, College of Science King Khalid University (6 Oct. 1999 – 9 Sept.2002)            
Acting Dean, College of Computer Science King Khalid University (8June2000 – 9Aug.2002) 
Acting Dean, College of Engineering (14 June 2001 – 9 Aug. 2002)
Dean, College of Education King Saud University, Abha Branch (4 May 1997 – 6 Sept. 1999)        
Assistant Professor, Department of Chemistry College of Science, King Saud University, Abha Branch (14 July 1992 – 18 Oct. 1998)
Acting Dean, College of Education King Saud University, Abha Branch (17 Oct. 1996 – 24 April 1997)
Vice Dean, College of Education King Saud University, Abha Branch (22 Feb. 1995 – 16 Oct. 1996 )      
 Teaching Assistant, Department of Chemistry King Saud University (1 Jan. 1981 – 22 July 1981)        
Teaching Assistant, Department of Chemistry Boston, MA USA ( 1 Sept. 1988 – 31 May 1992)

National and International Committees and Councils

Member of the Universities Affairs Council.
Chairman of Misk Schools Board of Directors.
Board of Trustees member, King Abdullah University of Science and Technology.
Board of Trustees member, Alfaisal University 
Selection committee chairman, King Faisal International Prize for Science.
Member of the Board of Directors of Alghad Association.
Member of the King Salman Award for Disability Research Member of civil service council.
Member of Directors King Faisal School
Member of higher education council
Ministry of Health Executive Board, Chairman
Ministry of Health International Advisory Board, Chairman
Ministry of Health National Advisory Board, Chairman
Health Services Council, Chairman
National Health Insurance Council, Chairman
National Commission on Smoking Prevention, Chairman
King Faisal Specialist Hospital & Research Center Board of Directors, Chairman
Medical Cities and Specialized Centers Board of Directors, Chairman
National Committee for the Care of the Mentally Ill and their Families, Member
GCC Health Ministers, Member
Civil Service Council, Member
National Commission on Drug Control, Member
Saudi Food and Drug Authority, Member
Vice chairman of Jazan University
Member of King Khalid University Council
Member of King Saud University Council
Chairman of scientific council KKU

Publications

 Scott C. Benson. Ping Cai, Marcelo Colon, Mohammed A. Haiza, Maritherese Tokles, John K. Snyder Use of carboxylic acids as chiral solvating agents for the determination of optical purity of chiral amines by NMR spectroscopy, J. Org. Chem. 1988, 53, 5335.
 Mohammed Haiza, Junning Lee, John K. Snyder Asymmetric syntheses of Salvia miltiorrhiza abietanoid o-quinones: methyl tanshinonate, tanshinone IIB, tanshindiol B and 3-hydroxytanshinone; J. Org. Chem. 1990, 55, 5008.
 The preparation and Spectral properties of 3.3.3.-Cr-Iamine tripropyl; Polyhedron, Fall, 1992.
 Mohammed A. Haiza, Amitav Sanyal, and John K. Snyder. O-Nitromandelic Acid: A Chiral Solvating Agent for the NMR Determination of Chiral Diamine Enantiometric Purity, Chirality 9:556-562(1997).
 S.A. El-Assiery and M.A. Al-Haiza: Synthesis of Some New Pyrimidine and Fused Pyrimidine Derivatives, Journal of the College of Science of King Saud University, Second issue of volume 10, (1998).
 Mohammed A. Al-Haiza: One Dimensional NMR Spectroscopy. College of Education, Abha. (Accepted for publication at the Research Centre).
 Saied A. El-Assiery and Mohammed A. Al-Haiza;: Synthesis and Reactions of 3-Arylidene-5-aryl 2(3H) Furanones. Egyptian Journal of Chemistry. *Mohammed A. Haiza: Synthesis of Some New 3,5-Bisaryl 1-2-Pyrazoline Derivatives of Expected Antimicrobial Activities. Al-Azhar Bull. Sci. Vol. 8, No. 2, pp. 445–454, (1997).
Mohammed A. Al Haiza, M.S. Mostafa and M.Y. El-Kady: Synthesis and Biological Evaluation of Some New Coumarin Derivatives, Molecules.
 Mohammed A. Al Haiza, Reactions with 6-Phenyl-2-thiouria Preparation of substituted and fused pyrimidine derivatives, J. Saudi Chem. Soc.,; Vol. 6, No. 1; pp. 71–82 (2002).
 Mohammed A. Al Haiza, Synthesis of Some New Compounds Containing The 2-phenyl-1H-Indolyl Moiety, JKSU. (Accepted).
Mohammed A. Al Haiza, Synthesis of the new dispiro[Thiazolidine-2,2`-[1,3]diazetidine-4',2''-5,5''-diacetic acid,a,a'-bis[2-(3,4-dichorophenyl)]-2-oxoethyl]-4,4''dioxo, Revue Roumaine de Chimie, 2000, 45 (11), 1019-102.
 Mohameed A. Al Haiza, Synthesis and Spectroscopic Studies of some Triazolopyrimidines and Pyrimidotriazines, JKKU. (Accepted).
Mohammed A. Al Haiza, Saied Abdullah El-Assiery, Galal Hosni Sayed, Synthesis and potential antimicrobial activity of some new compounds containing the pyrazol-3-one moiety, Acta Pharm. 51 (2001) 251-261.
 Mohammed A. Al Haiza, S. A. El-Assiery, M. S. Mostafa and A. M. El-Reedy, A convenient Synthesis of Thiazolo[3,2-a]-and Triazolo[4,3-a]-Pyrimidines and Pyrimido[2,1-c] Triazine Derivatives, JKAU: Sci. Vol 12, pp53–68 (1420 A.H./ 2000 A.D.).
 Mohamed M. Youssef and Mohammed A. Al Haiza, Synthesis of Some Pyrido[2',3':3,4]Pyrazolo[1,5-a]Pyrimidine, [1,5-a]-1,3,5-triazine and [5,1-c]-1,2,4-triazine Derivatives, Egypt. J. Chem. 43, No. 2, pp. 165–175 (2000).
 Seham Y. Hassan, Hassan M. Faidallah, Abdel Moneim El-Massry, Mohammed A. Al Haiza, and Mohamed M. El-Sadek, Synthesis and reactions of 2-Methyl-3-Substituted Pyrole or (furan)-5-Thiosemicarbazone derivatives, J. Saudi Chem. Soc.; Vol. 3 No 2, pp. 171–176 (1999).
Mohammed A. Al Haiza, S. A. El-Assiery and M. El-Kady, Reactions of 3-(p-Phenyl)-Benzoyl Propionic Acid with aromatic Aldehydes and some nitrogen Nucleophiles, Egypt J. chem.. 42, No. 1, pp. 83–90 (199).
Mohammed A. Al Haiza, M.S.Mostafa and M.Y.El.Kady, Preparation of Some New Coumarin Derivatives with Biological Activity, JKFU (Accepted).
 Mohammed .A. Al-Haiza, S.A. El-Assiery, G.H. Sayed and A.Fouda, Synthesis of Some New Quinoline, Indazole, Benzisoxazole, Quinazoline and Chromene Derivatives. Al-Azhar Bull. Sci. Vol. 13, No. 1 (June):pp. 75–85, 2002.
 21 M.A.Al-Haiza, M.S. Mostafa and M.Y. El-Kady: Synthesis and Biological Evaluation of Some New Coumarin Derivatives. Molecules 2003, 8, 275-286.

References

http://www.alfaisal.edu/exe_officers/Dr_Mohammed_A_Hayaza.pdf
https://www.arabnews.com/node/1636476/saudi-arabia
https://www.alfaisal.edu/en/president-msg
https://www.alfaisal.edu/assets/documents/profiles/Dr_Mohammed_Al_Hayaza.pdf
http://newsare.net/country/Spain/&nw=2996857

Living people
People from 'Asir Province
Government ministers of Saudi Arabia
King Saud University alumni
Boston University alumni
1959 births